Cambio de Clase is a television program that is the Spanish version of As the Bell Rings. It is shown on the Disney Channel and every Sunday on one cable broadcast. It is a Spanish adaption of the Disney Channel Italy Original Series Quelli dell'intervallo.

The premiere of the series in Spain took place on September 11, 2006 in the channel and the Disney Channel Spain 16th of the month and year when Disney Zone @ TVE. Since then broadcast daily on Disney Channel and Saturdays and Sundays at TVE.

The series is starring Andrea Guasch, Juan Luppi, Nadia de Santiago, Santiago Luisber, Sergio Garcia and Ismael Garcia who give life to Valentina, Nico, Bertini, Mafalda, Max and Nacho. In 2007, the characters played by Andrea Guasch and Sergio Martin were absent due to the filming of the Disney Channel Games 2007.

The second season began filming in June 2007 and debuted in late 2007 on Disney Channel Spain.

Characters 
 Max – played by Sergio Martín
 Bertini – played by Luisber Santiago
 Valentina – played by Andrea Guasch
 Newton – played by Rafael Ramos
 Mafalda – played by Nadia de Santiago
 Rocky – played by Maria Torres (Season 1–2 only)
 Laura – played by Maria Palacios
 Piñata – played by David Becerra
 Nico – played by Juan Lippi (Season 1–2 only)
 Luna – played by Sandra Blázquez
 Espi – played by Eduardo Espinilla (Season 1–2 only)
 Nacho – played by Ismael Garcia (starts from season 2)

References 

Spanish children's television series
Spanish-language Disney Channel original programming
2000s high school television series
2000s teen sitcoms
Television series about teenagers